The National Shrine of La Virgen Divina Pastora, known canonically as the Three Kings Parish, is a shrine in Gapan in the Philippines that was founded in 1589. It is one of the oldest Roman Catholic churches in the country, and the oldest and the biggest colonial church in Nueva Ecija. The church has been a pilgrimage site for two patron saints of Gapan and also of Nueva Ecija; the Three Kings, and the Divina Pastora (Divine Shepherdess). On April 26, 1986, the Catholic Bishops Conference of the Philippines declared the church as a National Shrine.

Foundation 

The Augustinians formally accepted Gapan and established in it a community with its own minister on August 28, 1595. Situated across the Rio Chico, Gapan was originally bounded by Manicling, San Miguel de Mayumo and the Cordillera mountains.  Due to its rapid progress, the Provincial Council decreed on October 31, 1636 that Gapan be divided into two vicariates. The first will be composed of Gapan, Junas and San Miguel and the second will be composed of the areas north of the river. In 1704, Governor General Domingo de Zabalburu ordered that all Chinese living in the missions of Bongabon, Santor, Carranglan and Pantabangan transfer to Gapan. These movement witnessed the steady increase of population. In 1612 Gapan merely had a population of 1,800 which soared to 3,651 in 1760 and in 1896, 15,238.

Construction 

The Order of Saint Augustine administered the parish of Gapan from its foundation in 1595. However the secular priests took over in 1770. The present church was constructed under the direction of the friars Laredo, Cornejo and Laneza from 1856 to 1872. Fray Francisco Laredo started the construction of the church and finished the work on the walls, the dome, the presbytery and the transept. It was his successors Fray Antonio Cornejo and Fray Leonardo Laneza who worked for the completion of the church.

The church was built on the spot cleared by Augustinian friars Contreras, Tendilla, Caballo and Salazar in 1595. The church is distinctly Byzantine in style and is built from blocks of limestone and bricks. The bricks, locally known as laryo, were made in two sites. The first site is only a few blocks away from the church in San Vicente while the second site is in San Lorenzo, the two oldest settlements in Gapan.

The exterior of the church is plain while its interior formerly has a central retablo with niches dedicated to the Epiphany of the Lord  and to the La Virgen Divina Pastora. This central retablo however was torn down in the 1970s due to infestation of termites. It was replaced with a modern style sanctuary dominated by a huge image of the Crucifixion, arguably the largest in the province of Nueva Ecija. Only the two side retablo are maintained to this day. Prominently displayed on the left retablo is the original miniature image of the Virgen Divina Pastora which was donated by the Valmonte Family in 1986. The right retablo enshrines the Adoration of the Magi.

While the palitada of the walls was stripped, the grand painting of the Holy Trinity on the church's dome has been preserved. Local artist, Isidoro Samonte painted this image in the early 1900s.

Image of La Virgen Divina Pastora 
The image of the La Virgen Divina Pastora is the object of the largest Marian pilgrimages in Central Luzon. Although the precise origins of the image are shrouded in legend, its recorded history is traced largely to the Valmonte Family.

In the 1700s, Doña Juana Valmonte, daughter of Don Bartolome de la Cruz Valmonte – Gapan’s first gobernadorcillo in 1747 – and Doña Eulalia Fernández, had a strange dream in which the Virgin Mary wanted to be fetched from Spain. Distraught, she sought the advice of her father who told her to consult a friar friend in Manila. Doña Juana then traveled to Manila to recount her dream to the friar. Impressed by her story, the friar told of the devotion to the Divina Pastora which was gaining popularity in Spain. Doña Juana, on her part, ordered an image from Spain and to enthrone it in their family estate. The image eventually arrived in Manila via the Acapulco Galleon, and was brought to Gapan. It then became the center of devotion for the family. Consequently, they started to celebrate her feast in thanksgiving for a bountiful harvest every May 1. Soon stories of miracles spread throughout the province and people came in throngs to celebrate the yearly fiesta.

In the 1800s, the La Virgen Divina Pastora was made patron of the parish of Gapan secondary to the Three Kings. Care of the image after the death of Dona Juana was given to her brother Don Basilio Valmonte who passed it to his son, General Panteleon Valmonte, the hero of the First Cry of Nueva Ecija. General Panteleon however was executed due to accusations of rebellion against Spain. Upon his death, the image was given to his wife Maxima Navarro-Valmonte for safekeeping.  It was finally handed to Donata Valmonte-Cala and her daughter Emma Valmote-Cala.

On December 19, 1963, Pope Paul VI approved the canonical coronation of the image of La Virgen Divina Pastora. Since the original image is privately owned, a church-owned image was used for the coronation rites which was presided by the first Bishop of the Diocese of Cabanatuan, Most Rev. Mariano Gaviola. The original image of the La Virgen Divina Pastora was eventually donated to the Parish of the Three Kings with the declaration of the church as a national shrine on April 26, 1986.

References

 Souvenir Program of the 50th Anniversary of the Canonical Coronation of Virgen Divina Pastora, Three Kings Parish, Gapan 2014
 Shrines, Incarnating Christ Today. St. Paul Philippines, 2004
 http://www.monvalmonte.com/threekingsparish/history.html

Roman Catholic churches in Nueva Ecija
Roman Catholic national shrines in the Philippines